Indru Nee Naalai Naan is a 1983 Indian Tamil-language film, directed by Major Sundarrajan. The film stars Sivakumar, Jaishankar, Lakshmi and Sulakshana. It is based on the novel Thookku Mara Nizhalil by C. A. Balan. The film was released on 12 August 1983.

Plot 

Marudhachalam marries Papathi, who prefers his brother Pazhaniappan. Papathi and Valli are childhood friends like sisters. Then Pazhaniappan marries Valli and has a child. Suddenly Marudhachalam dies before she gets to be with him intimately. She becomes a widow and raises Pazhaniappan's child. Now Papathi feels differently about Pazhaniappan and when Valli is gone, to have the second child, she asks Pazhaniappan to marry her. They both are on the way to get married, while they both change their minds. She goes back to being a widow and Pazhaniappan goes to see his wife and child. When Valli finds out, she tries to kill Papathi. Pazhaniappan tries to stop it, but Valli gets upset that he defends Papathi and she runs and falls into a well, hence committing suicide. Pazhaniappan goes to jail, stating he killed Valli as he feels guilty. He gets the death penalty. Papathi comes to see Pazhaniappan in the jail and he tells Papathi to marry someone else, but she refuses and commits suicide in front of Pazhaniappan.

Cast 
Sivakumar as Pazhaniappan
Jaishankar as Marudhachalam
Lakshmi as Papathi
Sulakshana as Valli
Thengai Srinivasan as Doctor
Manorama as Kamalam
Major Sundarrajan as a police officer

Production
Indru Nee Naalai Naan was based on the novel Thookku Mara Nizhalil by C. A. Balan which was inspired from true events of his life. It was directed by Major Sundarrajan, his second directorial after Kalthoon (1982) and was produced by his younger brother Sampath alongside Pala. Karuppiah. The film was launched on 12 October 1982. The song "Kaangeyam Kaalaigale" was shot at Aathur Road, Salem. The scenes were also shot at Salem Prison with special permission. L. R. Shanmugam's home at Salem was used as Sivakumar's house for the film.

Soundtrack 
Music was composed by Ilaiyaraaja. The song "Ponvaanam Panneer Thoovuthu" is set in the Carnatic raga Gourimanohari, and follows a  time signature. Writer Suka said the song uses the "spirit of the rain" to evoke love.

Release and reception 
Indru Nee Naalai Naan was released on 12 August 1983. Jayamanmadhan of Kalki praised the performances of the actors and Ilaiyaraaja's music and concluded by praising Sundarrajan for properly narrating a story but felt the end monologue could have been avoided.

References

External links 

1980 films
1980s Tamil-language films
1983 films
Films based on Indian novels
Films directed by Major Sundarrajan
Films scored by Ilaiyaraaja